Dead Injun Creek is a small stream in Grant County, Oregon, in the United States. The name Dead Injun commemorates a Native American (formerly called an Injun) who was killed in battle near the river's bank. The creek is within the South Fork John Day River drainage basin.

References

Rivers of Grant County, Oregon
Rivers of Oregon
Native American history of Oregon